Colette Ní Ghallchóir (born 1950, County Donegal, Ireland) is an Irish poet.

Works
 Idir dhá Ghleann, Baile Átha Cliath, Coiscéim, 1999
 An Chéad Chló, Gallimh, Cló Iar Chonnachta

External links
 http://catalogue.nli.ie/Author/Home?author=N%C3%AD%20Ghallch%C3%B3ir%2C%20Colette
 https://web.archive.org/web/20180810205739/http://www.irishwriters-online.com/ni-ghallchoir-colette/

Irish-language poets
Irish women poets
Living people
20th-century Irish people
21st-century Irish people
People from County Donegal
1950 births